Pinnipeds are marine mammals that evolved from arctoid carnivorans that includes seals, eared seals, and walruses. There are 34 recent species of pinnipeds and 102 species of fossil pinnipeds and their stem-relatives (Pinnipedimorpha), collectively referred to as pinnipedimorphs. Scientists still debate on which lineage of arctoid carnviroans are the closest relatives to the pinnipedimorphs, being either more closely related to bears or to musteloids. Two stem-pinniped families found outside of Pinnipedimorpha, Amphicynodontidae and Semantoridae, were in the past considered to be subfamilies of Ursidae and Mustelidae respectively. In comparison to the two other major groups of marine or sea mammals, cetaceans and sirenians, pinnipeds are a relatively younger group having appeared about 24 to 38 million years ago and are still able to return on land to breed.

The list of fossil taxa is based on mostly the historiographical data from Valenzuela-Toro and Pyenson (2019). The two stem-pinniped arctoid families Amphicynodontidae and Semantoridae are included here as well, although neither family are members of Pinnipedimorpha. The list does not include the recently extinct Caribbean monk seal (Neomonachus tropicalis) and the Japanese sea lion (Zalophus japonicus), as they became extinct within the last two centuries.

Phylogeny
Below is an overall phylogeny of the taxa covered in the article followed after a composite tree in Berta et al. (2018) and a total-evidence (combined molecular-morphological) dataset in Paterson et al. (2020):

Stem-pinniped arctoids

†Amphicynodontidae Simpson, 1945

†Amphicticeps Matthew & Granger, 1924
†Amphicticeps makhchinus Wang et al., 2005
†Amphicticeps dorog Wang et al., 2005
†Amphicticeps shackelfordi Matthew & Granger, 1924
†Drassonax Galbreath, 1953
†Drassonax harpagops Galbreath, 1953
†Parictis Scott, 1893 [Campylocynodon Chaffee, 1954]
†Parictis primaevus Scott, 1893
†Parictis personi (Chaffee, 1954) [Campylocynodon personi Chaffee, 1954]
†Parictis montanus Clark & Guensburg, 1972
†Parictis parvus Clark & Beerbower, 1967
†Parictis gilpini Clark & Guensburg, 1972
†Parictis dakotensis Clark, 1936
†Kolponomos Stirton, 1960
†Kolponomos newportensis Tedford et al., 1994
†Kolponomos clallamensis Stirton, 1960
†Allocyon Merriam, 1930
†Allocyon loganensis Merriam, 1930
†Wangictis L. de Bonis et al., 2019
†Wangictis tedfordi (Wang & Qiu, 2003) [Pachycynodon tedfordi Wang & Qiu, 2003]
†Pachycynodon Schlosser, 1888
†Pachycynodon tenuis Teilhard de Chardin, 1915
†Pachycynodon filholi Schlosser, 1888
†Pachycynodon boriei (Filhol, 1876) [Cynodon robustus Filhol, 1876; Pachycynodon gryei (Filhol, 1876); Pachycynodon leymeriei (Filhol, 1876); Pachycynodon curvirostris (Filhol, 1876); Pachycynodon ferratus (Quenstedt, 1885)]
†Pachycynodon crassirostris Schlosser, 1888
†Amphicynodon Filhol, 1881 [Cynodon Aymard, 1848, name already taken by a fish]
†Amphicynodon mongoliensis Janovskaja, 1970
†Amphicynodon teilhardi (Matthew & Granger, 1924) [Cynodon teilhardi Matthew & Granger, 1924]
†Amphicynodon typicus Schlosser, 1888
†Amphicynodon chardini Cirot & De Bonis, 1992
†Amphicynodon cephalogalinus Teilhard, 1915
†Amphicynodon gracilis (Filhol, 1874) [Cynodon gracilis Filhol, 1874]
†Amphicynodon crassirostris (Filhol, 1876) [Cynodon crassirostris Filhol, 1874]
†Amphicynodon brachyrostris (Filhol, 1876) [Cynodon brachyrostris Filhol, 1876]
†Amphicynodon leptorhynchus (Filhol, 1874) [Cynodon leptorhynchus Filhol, 1874]
†Amphicynodon velaunus (Aymard, 1846)

†Semantoridae Orlov, 1931

†Necromites V. V. Bogachev, 1940
†Necromites nestoris V. V. Bogachev, 1940
†Potamotherium Geoffroy, 1833
†Potamotherium miocenicum Peters, 1868
†Potamotherium valletoni Geoffroy, 1833
†Puijila Rybczynski et al., 2009
†Puijila darwini Rybczynski et al., 2009
†Semantor Orlov, 1931
†Semantor macrurus Orlov, 1931

Stem-pinniped pinnipedimorphs

†Enaliarctidae Mitchell & Tedford, 1973

†Enaliarctos Mitchell & Tedford, 1973
†Enaliarctos barnesi Berta, 1991
†Enaliarctos mealsi Mitchell & Tedford, 1973
†Enaliarctos tedfordi Berta, 1991
†Enaliarctos mitchelli Barnes, 1979
†Enaliarctos emlongi Berta, 1991

Stem-pinniped pinnipediforms

†Pinnarctidion Barnes, 1979
†Pinnarctidion rayi Berta, 1994
†Pinnarctidion bishopi Barnes, 1979

†Pacificotaria Barnes, 1992
†Pacificotaria hadromma Barnes, 1992

†Pteronarctos Barnes, 1989
†Pteronarctos piersoni Barnes, 1990
†Pteronarctos goedertae Barnes, 1989

Pinnipeds

Phocoidea J.E. Gray, 1821

Phocidae J. E. Gray, 1821
†Noriphoca Dewaele et al., 2018
†Noriphoca gaudini Guiscardi, 1870 [Monotherium gaudini Guiscardi, 1870]
†Devinophocinae Koretsky & Holec, 2002
†Kawas Cozzuol, 2001
†Kawas benegasorum Cozzuol, 2001
†Devinophoca Koretsky & Holec, 2002
†Devinophoca emryi Koretsky & Rahmat, 2015
†Devinophoca claytoni Koretsky & Rahmat, 2002
Monachinae E. L. Trouessart, 1897
†Australophoca Valenzuela‐Toro et al., 2016
†Australophoca changorum Valenzuela‐Toro et al., 2016
†Virginiaphoca Dewaele et al., 2018
†Virginiaphoca magurai Dewaele et al., 2018
†Properiptychus Ameghino, 1897
†Properiptychus argentinus Ameghino, 1897
†Homiphoca Muizon & Hendey, 1980
†Homiphoca capensis (Hendey & Repenning, 1972) [Prionodelphis capensis Hendey & Repenning, 1972]
†Homiphoca murfreesi Hafed et al.,2022
†Acrophoca Muizon, 1981
†Acrophoca longirostris Muizon, 1981
†Hadrokirus Amson & De Muizon, 2013
†Hadrokirus martini Amson & De Muizon, 2013
†Hadrokirus novotini Hafed et al.,2022
†Piscophoca Muizon, 1981
†Piscophoca pacifica Muizon, 1981
†Pristiphoca Gervais, 1853
†Pristiphoca rugidens (Meyer, 1845) [Monachus rugidens Meyer, 1845]
†Pristiphoca occitana Gervais, 1853
†Terranectes Rahmat et al., 2017
†Terranectes parvus Rahmat et al., 2017
†Terranectes magnus Rahmat et al., 2017
†Magnotherium Rahmat et al., 2021
†Magnotherium johnsii Rahmat et al., 2021
†Afrophoca Koretsky & Domning, 2014
†Afrophoca libyca Koretsky & Domning, 2014
†Pontophoca Kretzoi, 1941
†Pontophoca jutlandica Koretsky et al., 2014
†Pontophoca sarmatica (Alekseev, 1924) [Phoca sarmatica Alekseev, 1924]
†Pontophoca simionescui Kretzoi, 1941
†Palmidophoca Ginsburg & Janvier, 1975
†Palmidophoca callirhoe Ginsburg & Janvier, 1975
†Messiphoca Muizon, 1981
†Messiphoca mauretanica Muizon, 1981
†Auroraphoca Dewaele et al., 2018
†Auroraphoca atlantica Dewaele et al., 2018
†Sarcodectes Rule et al., 2020
†Sarcodectes magnus Rule et al., 2020
Monachini E. L. Trouessart, 1897
†Pliophoca Tavani, 1941
†Pliophoca etrusca Tavani, 1941
†Eomonachus Rule et al., 2020
†Eomonachus belegaerensis Rule et al., 2020
Miroungini Muizon, 1981
†Callophoca van Beneden, 1876
†Callophoca obscura van Beneden, 1876
Phocinae J.E. Gray, 1869
†Leptophoca True, 1906
†Leptophoca amphiatlantica Koretsky et al., 2012
†Leptophoca proxima (van Beneden, 1876) [Phoca proxima van Beneden, 1876; Leptophoca lenis True 1906]
†Nanophoca Dewaele et al., 2017
†Nanophoca vitulinoides (van Beneden, 1871) [Phoca vitulinoides van Beneden, 1871]
†Frisiphoca Dewaele et al., 2018
†Frisiphoca affine (van Beneden, 1876) [Monotherium affine van Beneden, 1876]
†Frisiphoca aberratum (van Beneden, 1876) [Monotherium aberratum van Beneden, 1876)]
†Cryptophoca Koretsky & Ray, 1994
†Cryptophoca maeotica (Nordmann, 1860) [Monotherium maeotica Koretsky 2001]
†Monotherium van Beneden, 1876
†Monotherium delognii van Beneden, 1876
†Prophoca van Beneden, 1876
†Prophoca rousseaui van Beneden, 1876
†Monachopsis Kretzoi, 1941
†Monachopsis pontica (Eichwald, 1850) [Monachus pontica Eichwald, 1850]
†Sarmatonectes Koretsky, 2001
†Sarmatonectes sintsovi Koretsky, 2001
†Phocanella van Beneden, 1877
†Phocanella pumila van Beneden, 1877
Erignathini Chapski, 1955
†Platyphoca van Beneden, 1876
†Platyphoca danica Koretsky et al., 2014
†Platyphoca vulgaris van Beneden, 1876
Cystophorini Burns & Fay, 1970
†Miophoca Zapfe, 1937
†Miophoca vetusta Zapfe, 1937
†Pachyphoca Koretsky & Rahmat, 2013
†Pachyphoca chapskii Koretsky & Rahmat, 2013
†Pachyphoca ukrainica Koretsky & Rahmat, 2013
Phocini J. E. Gray, 1821
Histriophoca Gill, 1873
†Histriophoca alekseevi Koretsky, 2001
†Gryphoca van Beneden, 1877
†Gryphoca nordica Koretsky et al., 2014
†Gryphoca similis van Beneden, 1877
†Batavipusa Koretsky & Peters, 2008
†Batavipusa neerlandica Koretsky & Peters, 2008
†Planopusa Rahmat & Koretsky, 2021
†Planopusa semenovi Rahmat & Koretsky, 2021
†Praepusa Kretzoi, 1941
†Praepusa pannonica Kretzoi, 1941
†Praepusa boeska Koretsky et al., 2015
†Praepusa magyaricus Koretsky, 2003
†Praepusa tarchankutica Antoniuk & Koretsky, 1984
†Praepusa vindobonensis (Toula, 1897) [Phoca vindobonensis Toula, 1897]
Phoca Linnaeus, 1758
†Phoca moori Newton, 1890

Otarioidea J. E. Gray, 1821

†Desmatophocidae Hay, 1930
†Eodesmus Tate-Jones et al., 2020
†Eodesmus condoni Tate-Jones et al., 2020
†Allodesminae Mitchell, 1968
†Atopotarus Downs, 1956
†Atopotarus courseni Downs, 1956
†Allodesmus Kellogg, 1922
†Allodesmus packardi Barnes, 1972
†Allodesmus uraiporensis Tonomori et al., 2018
†Allodesmus naorai Kohno, 1996
†Allodesmus sinanoensis Nagao, 1941
†Allodesmus demerei Boessenecker & Churchill, 2018
†Allodesmus kernensis Kellogg, 1922
†Desmatophocinae Hay, 1930
†Desmatophoca Condon, 1906
†Desmatophoca brachycephala Barnes, 1987
†Desmatophoca oregonensis Condon, 1906
Odobenidae J. A. Allen, 1880
†Prototaria Takeyama & Ozawa, 1984
†Prototaria planicephala Kohno, 1994
†Prototaria primigena Takeyama & Ozawa, 1984
†Proneotherium Kohno et al., 1995
†Proneotherium repenningi Kohno et al., 1995
†Neotherium Kellogg, 1931
†Neotherium mirum Kellogg, 1931
†Kamtschatarctos Dubrovo, 1981
†Kamtschatarctos sinelnikovae Dubrovo, 1981
†Pseudotaria Kohno, 2006
†Pseudotaria muramotoi Kohno, 2006
†Archaeodobenus Tanaka & Kohno, 2015
†Archaeodobenus akamatsui Tanaka & Kohno, 2015
†Nanodobenus Velez & Salinas-Marquez, 2018
†Nanodobenus arandai Velez & Salinas-Marquez, 2018
†Pelagiarctos Barnes, 1988
†Pelagiarctos thomasi Barnes, 1988
†Titanotaria Magallanes et al., 2018
†Titanotaria orangensis Magallanes et al., 2018
†Imagotaria Mitchell, 1968
†Imagotaria downsi Mitchell, 1968
†Pontolis True, 1905
†Pontolis barroni Biewer, Velez-Juarbe & Parham, 2020
†Pontolis kohnoi Biewer, Velez-Juarbe & Parham, 2020
†Pontolis magnus (True, 1905) [Pontoleon magnus True, 1905]
†Osodobenus Biewer, Velez-Juarbe & Parham, 2020
†Osodobenus eodon Biewer, Velez-Juarbe & Parham, 2020
Neodobenia Magallanes et al., 2018
†Dusignathinae Mitchell, 1968
†Gomphotaria Barnes & Rashke, 1991
†Gomphotaria pugnax Barnes & Rashke, 1991
†Dusignathus Kellogg, 1927
†Dusignathus seftoni Deméré, 1994
†Dusignathus santacruzensis Kellogg, 1927
Odobeninae J. A. Allen, 1880
†Aivukus Repenning & Tedford, 1977
†Aivukus cedrosensis Repenning & Tedford, 1977
†Protodobenus Horikawa, 1995
†Protodobenus japonicus Horikawa, 1995
†Pliopedia Kellogg, 1921
†Pliopedia pacifica Kellogg, 1921
†Ontocetus Leidy, 1859
†Ontocetus emmonsi Leidy, 1859
†Valenictus Mitchell, 1961
†Valenictus chulavistensis Deméré 1994
†Valenictus imperialensis Mitchell, 1961
Odobenus Brisson, 1762
†Odobenus mandanoensis Tomida, 1989
Panotariidae Velez-Juarbe, 2017
†Eotaria Boessenecker & Churchill, 2015
†Eotaria circa Velez-Juarbe, 2017
†Eotaria crypta Boessenecker & Churchill, 2015
Otariidae J. E. Gray, 1825
Callorhinae Muizon, 1978 
†Pithanotaria Kellogg, 1925
†Pithanotaria starri Kellogg, 1925
Callorhinus J. E. Gray, 1859 
†Callorhinus inouei (Kohno, 1992) [Thalassoleon inouei Kohno, 1992]
†Callorhinus macnallyae (Repenning & Tedford, 1977) [Thalassoleon macnallyae Repenning & Tedford, 1977] 
†Callorhinus gilmorei Berta & Deméré, 1986 
Otariinae J. E. Gray, 1825 
†Thalassoleon Repenning & Tedford, 1977
†Thalassoleon mexicanus Repenning & Tedford, 1977
Zalophini J. E. Gray, 1869
†Proterozetes Barnes et al., 2006
†Proterozetes ulysses Barnes et al., 2006
†Oriensarctos Mitchell, 1968
†Oriensarctos watasei (Matsumoto, 1925) [Eumetopias watasei Matsumoto, 1925]
Otariini J. E. Gray, 1825
Otaria Péron, 1816
†Otaria fischeri Gervais & Ameghino, 1880
Neophoca J. E. Gray, 1866
†Neophoca palatina King, 1983
†Hydrarctos Muizon, 1978
†Hydrarctos lomasiensis Muizon, 1978

See also
List of pinniped species

References

Prehistoric pinnipeds
Fossils
Fossil record of animals